Laurents Hörr (born 11 September 1997) is a German racing driver who currently competes in the European Le Mans Series.

Career

Lower formula
Hörr began his open-wheel racing career in 2014, competing in a pair of races with Dutt Motorsport, a team he co-owned with Rolf and Oliver Dutt, in the Formula Renault 1.6 Northern European Cup. The following season, he scored his first open wheel victory at Anderstorp Raceway while competing in the Formula Renault 1.6 Nordic championship. Hörr started competing in Formula Renault 2.0 machinery in 2016. Following the 2017 season, a lack of funding prematurely ended his junior formula career.

Sports car racing
Due to Hörr's lack of funding, he made the transition to sports car racing for the 2018 season, taking part in the Michelin Le Mans Cup with French team CD Sport. His first season with the team was quiet, with Hörr finishing 7th in LMP3 class points. For 2019, he joined Luxembourg-based DKR Engineering. His second season in LMP3 machinery proved much more fruitful, as he and co-driver François Kirmann took overall LMP3 class honors in the Michelin Le Mans Cup, tallying two wins and five podiums across seven races. In February 2020, Hörr was drafted into Team Project 1's #56 GTE Am entry for the final four races of the 2019–20 FIA World Endurance Championship, replacing David Heinemeier Hansson. In Hörr's first race for the team, at Circuit of the Americas, the team took pole position in class alongside a third-place finish. In October of that year, Hörr and Jean Glorieux secured DKR Engineering's fourth consecutive Michelin Le Mans Cup title; Hörr's second in as many years. Hörr returned to DKR in 2021, taking on a full-season campaign in the European Le Mans Series. Alongside a revolving door of drivers, he claimed three race victories and took the LMP3 class title after a fourth-place finish at the final round at Portimão.

In late 2021, Hörr was nominated by the promoters and organizers of the FIA World Endurance Championship to participate in the 2021 rookie test at Bahrain International Circuit. The following season, he made his debut at the 24 Hours of Le Mans, competing in the LMP2 class for DKR Engineering. 2023 saw Hörr return full-time to the European Le Mans Series, competing for IDEC Sport alongside Paul-Loup Chatin and Paul Lafargue in the LMP2 class.

Racing record

Career summary

* Season still in progress.

Complete FIA World Endurance Championship results
(key) (Races in bold indicate pole position; races in italics indicate fastest lap)

Complete European Le Mans Series results 
(key) (Races in bold indicate pole position; results in italics indicate fastest lap)

Complete IMSA SportsCar Championship results
(key) (Races in bold indicate pole position)

* Season still in progress.

Complete 24 Hours of Le Mans results

References

External links
Laurents Hörr at Motorsport.com

1997 births
Living people
German racing drivers
Formula Renault 2.0 NEC drivers
FIA World Endurance Championship drivers
European Le Mans Series drivers
Asian Le Mans Series drivers
WeatherTech SportsCar Championship drivers
24 Hours of Le Mans drivers
Le Mans Cup drivers
Koiranen GP drivers